Dexiothetism refers to a reorganisation of a clade's bauplan, with right becoming ventral and left becoming dorsal. The organism would then recruit a new left hand side.

Details
If a bilaterally symmetrical ancestor were to become affixed by its right hand side, it would occlude all features on that side. When that organism wanted to become secondarily bilaterally symmetrical again, it would be forced to resculpt its new left and right hand sides from the old left hand side. The end result is a bilaterally symmetrical animal, but with its dorsoventral axis rotated a quarter of a turn.

Implications
Dexiothetism has been implicated in the origin of the unusual embryology of the cephalochordate amphioxus, whereby its gill slits originate on the left hand side and the migrate to the right hand side.

In Jefferies' Calcichordate Theory, he supposes that all chordates and their mitrate ancestors are dexiothetic.

References

Biology terminology